The Croatian First League of Water Polo is the top water polo league in Croatia. 

The league was formed in 1991 with the dissolution of the Yugoslav First League of Water Polo and its first season started in 1992. The league is operated by the Croatian Water Polo Federation.

Current teams
The following 8 clubs compete in the league during the 2015–16 season:

Previous winners
Key

Performances

By club

External links 
Croatian First League of Water Polo website (in Croatian)
Adriatic Water Polo League
Croatian Water Polo Cup

2
Croatia
Recurring sporting events established in 1991
1991 establishments in Croatia
Professional sports leagues in Croatia